The Bundesliga (women) 2002–03 was the 13th season of the Bundesliga (women), Germany's premier football league. It began on 25 August 2002 and ended on 15 June 2003.

Final standings

Results

Top scorers

References

2002-03
Ger
1
Women